Friedrich Bernhard (5 October 1888 – 29 December 1945) was a German Lieutenant-General of the Cavalry, serving during World War II as a Panzer commander; he was a recipient of the German Cross in Gold on 17 March 1944. He held command of Special Corps 532 in the 9th Army. Captured by the Red Army, he was sentenced to death by a Soviet military tribunal at Bryansk on 29 December 1945 for atrocities committed in the Bryansk area, and executed.

Notes

References

 
 

1945 deaths
Lieutenant generals of the German Army (Wehrmacht)
Recipients of the Gold German Cross
1888 births
Nazis executed in the Soviet Union

Nazis convicted of war crimes
People executed for war crimes
Panzer commanders